Joseph Milner (22 August 1937 – 1993) was an English cricketer. He played for Essex between 1957 and 1961.

References

External links

1937 births
1993 deaths
English cricketers
Essex cricketers
Cricketers from Johannesburg
Players cricketers
English cricketers of 1946 to 1968